Tlacoapa is one of the 81 municipalities of Guerrero, in south-western Mexico. The municipal seat lies at Tlacoapa.  The municipality covers an area of 326.3 km².

In 2010, the municipality had a total population of 9,967.

References

Municipalities of Guerrero